was a town located in Oe District, Tokushima Prefecture, Japan.

As of 2003, the town had an estimated population of 8,484 and a population density of 479.59 persons per km2.

On October 1, 2004, Kawashima, along with the towns of Kamojima and Yamakawa, and the village of Misato (all from Oe District), was merged to create the new city of Yoshinogawa.

External links
 Yoshinogawa official website 

Dissolved municipalities of Tokushima Prefecture
Yoshinogawa, Tokushima